Kasthuri Maan is a 2005 Tamil film directed by Malayalam director A. K. Lohithadas. The film, a remake of the director's own Malayalam film of same name, and his only Tamil project to date, stars Prasanna and Meera Jasmine, who reprised her role from the original. It also features Shammi Thilakan, Sarath Babu, V. M. C. Haneefa, Bharathi Kannan, Pawan, Vinodini and Suja. Kasthuri Maan'''s story revolves around a young college girl who helps her lover realize his dream of becoming an IAS officer amidst her own problems. The film released during Diwali 2005 and had a generally positive reception.

Plot
The movie starts with a mature Arun Kumar (Prasanna), now a district collector. The story is narrated in a flashback where his father Palaniappan (Sarath Babu) wants him to get married. Palaniappan used to be a rich film producer and had borrowed money from a rich person, but is unable to repay his debt. The rich man wants his daughter to marry Arun, but Arun does not want to marry.

Umashankari (Meera Jasmine) and Arun study in the same college. Uma is a lively, mischievous girl on campus, but at home, faces acute poverty and takes up various odd jobs to take care of her house and to stay away from her sister's husband, who makes advances towards her. In the meantime, Palaniappan attempts suicide because he is deeply in debt. Uma steps in and helps Arun, who is preparing for I.A.S. exams. She does everything to ensure that he becomes an I.A.S. officer. He in turn, promises to marry her and rescue her from her situation. However, Uma, after an unfortunate encounter with her brother-in–law, lands in prison, and the couple is reunited in the climax..

 Cast 

 Prasanna as Arunachalam Palaniappan
 Meera Jasmine as Umashankari Vetrivel
 Shammi Thilakan as C. K. Nagarajan
 Sarath Babu as Palaniappan
 Geetha Ravishankar as Arun's mother
 Vinodini as Prema, Umashankari's sister
 Suja Varunee as Sunitha
 Kulappulli Leela as Muniyamma
 Anjali Devi as Vadivammal
 Devi Chandana as Arunachalam's sister
 V. M. C. Haneefa
 Karunas
 T. K. Kala
 Bharathi Kannan
 Pawan as Kasi
 Sai Pallavi as College girl (uncredited junior artist)

Soundtrack
The soundtrack was composed by Ilaiyaraaja while the lyrics for all the songs were written by Vaali, Muthulingam, Mu. Metha, Pazhani Bharathi & Na. Muthukumar.

Critical reception
The Hindu wrote, "Sumangala Arts and maker A.K.Lohithadas...deserve to be lauded for not succumbing to the lure of the commercial format and dwelling on a moving storyline that has comedy, sentiment, romance and passion in right proportions. And all these blend with the story to form a cohesive whole". Indiaglitz.com wrote, "A dominant performance by Meera Jasmine coupled with a touchy screenplay by director Lohitha Dass makes Kasthoori Maan'' an engrossing movie. With unpredictable sequence of events and crisp dialogues by Jaya Mohan, the movie is certainly an offbeat entertainer worth a watch".

References

Tamil remakes of Malayalam films
2005 films
2000s Tamil-language films
Films scored by Ilaiyaraaja
Films with screenplays by A. K. Lohithadas
Films directed by A. K. Lohithadas